Turano Lodigiano is a comune (municipality) in the Province of Lodi in the Italian region Lombardy, located about  southeast of Milan and about  east of Lodi.

Turano Lodigiano borders the following municipalities: Credera Rubbiano, Moscazzano, Cavenago d'Adda, Mairago, Bertonico, Secugnago, Casalpusterlengo, Terranova dei Passerini.

References

Cities and towns in Lombardy